Judith Humphreys is a Welsh actress who appeared in the films Hedd Wyn and The Storms of August.
She has also worked with charities Christian Aid and Cofis Bach. In 2014 she founded Codi'r To, a Welsh organisation similar to that of El Sistema.

External links 
 NY Times movies
 

Welsh film actresses
Living people
Year of birth missing (living people)